This Mixtape Is Fire (stylized as This Mixtape is Fire. or This MIxtape is Fire.) is the fourth EP by American DJ and record producer Dillon Francis. It was released on August 14, 2015.

Critical reception

The EP received overall positive reviews from critics. David Jeffries, from AllMusic, wrote: "With this 2015 EP, Dillon Francis puts a leash on his prankster persona and focuses on his producer side with fantastic and chilled results". Steve Knopper, from Newsday, stated that "[the] stopgap EP by veteran DJ is star-studded, explosive, sometimes funny".

Track listing

Charts

References

Albums produced by Dillon Francis
Albums produced by Calvin Harris
Electronic EPs
2015 EPs
Dance music EPs